The Morris Bridge is a bridge over the Illinois River   completed in late 2002, replacing an older bridge built in 1934.

References

Bridges completed in 2002
Transportation buildings and structures in Grundy County, Illinois
Bridges over the Illinois River
2002 establishments in Illinois
Steel bridges in the United States
Girder bridges in the United States
Road bridges in Illinois